Randolph John Velischek (born February 10, 1962) is a Canadian former professional ice hockey defenceman who played ten seasons in the National Hockey League from 1982–83 until 1991–92 for the Minnesota North Stars, New Jersey Devils, and Quebec Nordiques.  Randy Velischek was drafted 53rd overall by the North Stars in the 1980 NHL Entry Draft. He played 509 career NHL games, scoring 21 goals and 97 points.

He was also the head coach of the Metropolitan Riveters of the National Women's Hockey League for the 2018–19 season.

Playing career
Velischek was born in Montreal, Quebec. As a youth, he played in the 1974 and 1975 Quebec International Pee-Wee Hockey Tournaments with a minor ice hockey team from Mount Royal, Quebec. He spent his junior hockey career with the Lac St-Louis Lions of the Quebec Amateur Hockey Association and the Verdun Éperviers of the Quebec Major Junior Hockey League. After his junior career ended, Velischek played four years of college hockey for the Providence Friars from 1979 to 1983, where he majored in business and French, graduating with honors.

In addition to playing in the NHL, Velischek played professionally in the American Hockey League for the Springfield Indians, Maine Mariners, Halifax Citadels, and Cornwall Aces, the International Hockey League for the Milwaukee Admirals, the Central Hockey League for the Salt Lake Golden Eagles, and the British Hockey League for the Durham Wasps.

Life after hockey
From 1995 to 2006, Velischek served as a broadcaster for the New Jersey Devils on ABC Radio and WFAN-AM.

Beginning in 2007–08 school year, Velischek taught at the Pingry School as a German and French teacher and coached middle school ice hockey. On June 11, 2009, Velischeck was hired as the boy's high school ice hockey coach at Morristown-Beard School. Along with coaching at Morristown-Beard School, Velischek was also the hockey director at Twin Oaks Ice Rink in Morristown, New Jersey, and runs RJV Hockey School.

On September 20, 2018, nine days before the start of the season, he was named the head coach of the New Jersey Devils-associated Metropolitan Riveters of the National Women's Hockey League, based in Newark, New Jersey, despite not having any previous experience in women's hockey. He was not retained for the 2019–20 season after the Devils severed ties with the Riveters and the team performed disappointingly.

Personal life
Following in his father's footsteps, Velischek's son Alex also played four years of college hockey for Providence. Alex was drafted by the Pittsburgh Penguins in the fifth round (123rd overall) in the 2009 NHL Draft. Randy was named hockey director of the Ramapo Saints tier 1,2 & 3 hockey program. In addition to son Alex, Randy has a son Anders, stepsons Axel and Olin Witt and a daughter Abbey. Randy and his wife, Sharon reside in northern New Jersey and Quebec, Canada.

Career statistics

Awards and honors

References

External links
 
 RJV Hockey School

1962 births
Living people
Canadian expatriate ice hockey players in the United States
Canadian ice hockey coaches
Canadian ice hockey defencemen
Cornwall Aces players
Halifax Citadels players
Ice hockey people from Montreal
Maine Mariners players
Milwaukee Admirals (IHL) players
Minnesota North Stars draft picks
Minnesota North Stars players
Premier Hockey Federation coaches
New Jersey Devils announcers
New Jersey Devils players
Providence Friars men's ice hockey players
Quebec Nordiques players
Salt Lake Golden Eagles (CHL) players
Springfield Indians players
Verdun Éperviers players
AHCA Division I men's ice hockey All-Americans